The 2019 Cavan Senior Football Championship was the 110th edition of Cavan GAA's premier gaelic football tournament for senior graded clubs in County Cavan, Ireland. The tournament consists of 12 teams, with the winner representing Cavan in the Ulster Senior Club Football Championship.

The championship starts with a league stage and then progresses to a knock out stage.

Castlerahan were the defending champions, having beaten Crosserlough in the previous years final.

Castlerahan won their second title in a row, defeating neighbours Ramor United in the final.

Team Changes
The following teams have changed division since the 2018 championship season.

To Championship
Promoted from 2018 Cavan Intermediate Football Championship
  Mullahoran  -  (Intermediate Champions)

From Championship
Relegated to 2019 Cavan Intermediate Football Championship
  Ballinagh

League Stage
All 12 teams enter the competition at this stage. A random draw determines which teams face each other in each of the four rounds. No team can meet each other twice in the group stage. The top 8 teams go into a seeded draw for the quarter-finals while the bottom 3 teams will enter a Relegation Playoff. If teams are level on points and a place in the quarter-final is at stake, a Playoff will be conducted to determine who goes through.

Round 1

Round 2

Round 3

Round 4

Knock-Out Stage

Quarter-finals

Semi-finals

Final

Relegation play-offs

The 3 bottom placed teams the league phase will enter the relegation play-offs. The 10th and 11th placed teams from the league phase will face each other in the Relegation Semi-Final, with the winner maintaining their senior status for 2020. The loser will face the 12th placed team with the loser being relegated to the 2020 Intermediate Championship.

References

External links
 Official Cavan GAA Website

Cavan SFC
Cavan Senior Football Championship
Cavan GAA Football championships